The Miss Nicaragua 2016 pageant, was held on March 5, 2016 in Managua, after several weeks of events.  At the conclusion of the final night of competition, Marina Jacoby from Matagalpa won the title. She represented Nicaragua at Miss Universe 2016 held in Philippines later that year. The rest of the finalists would enter different pageants.

Placements

Special awards

 Best Hair - Managua - Brianny Chamorro
 Miss La Prensa - Chontales - Jahaira Rosales
 Miss Elegance - RACCN - Virgina Chow
 Best Smile - Matagalpa - Marina Jacoby
 Miss Photogenic - Managua - Brianny Chamorro
 Miss Congeniality - Mateare - Jeimy López
 Most Beautiful Face - Carazo - Bianca Gutiérrez

Official Contestants

Trivia

 Matagalpa has to wait 40 years to recover the crown. Marina Jacoby became the third Queen from this region to win since the Miss Nicaragua pageant began in 1955. The first one was Margine Davidson, Miss Nicaragua 1968, and the other one was Ivania Navarro, Miss Nicaragua 1976.
 Viewers were able to interact with the pageant via Movistar. Fans were able to vote for their favorite contestant through the Miss Nicaragua website, from February 5 to March 5. Miss Chinandega, Maria José Salazar, won the most MSM votes among the contestants, winning her spot in the Top 6.

Judges

 Dr. Luis Douglas Contreras -  General Manager of Dental Care
 Arquimedes Gonzalez - Editor of La Prensa Magazine
 Julio Rosales - Professional Photographer
 Melissa Fagot - Administrative Manager of Med Spa©
 Juan Brenes - Professional Hair Stylist
 Maria Eugenia Cuadra - Representative of Ivana's Boutique
 Kelly Molina - Fashion Designer
 Rafael Garzon - Nicaraguan Goldsmith

Background Music

Opening Show – Luis Enrique Mejía Godoy & Tierra Fértil - "Raíces Americanas"
Swimsuit Competition –  Party Station - "DJ Techno Re-Mix Medley"
Evening Gown Competition – James Pants - "Neverland"

References

Miss Nicaragua
2016 in Nicaragua
2016 beauty pageants